This list of cases involving Lord Mansfield includes his major reported legal judgments, particularly during the time that Lord Mansfield served as the Lord Chief Justice of the English Court of the King's Bench from 1756 to 1788. He made historical contributions to the common law, particularly in declaring slavery to be unlawful, and in elaborating essential principles of good faith in the law of contracts.

King's Bench

1750s
Robinson v Robinson (1756) 96 ER 999, Lord Mansfield's first case, holding a will effective if, even uncertainly, it does "manifest general intent"
Cooper v Chitty (1756) 1 Burr 36, trover and conversion
R v Richardson (1758) 97 ER 426, principles of representative accountability in companies

1760s
Moses v Macferlan (1760) 2 Burr 1005, unjust enrichment, or quasi-contract
Pillans & Rose v Van Mierop & Hopkins (1765) 3 Burr 1663, irrelevance of consideration
Carter v Boehm (1766) 3 Burr 1905, good faith principle in context of insurance
Alderson v Temple (1768) 96 ER 384, on fraudulent preferences in insolvency aimed at equality
Millar v Taylor (1769) 4 Burr. 2303, declaring a perpetual copyright, overruled by Donaldson v Becket (1774) 4 Burr 2408

1770s
Tinker v Poole (1770) 5 Burr 2657, conversion
Somerset v Stewart (1772) 98 ER 499, illegality of slavery at common law
Campbell v Hall (1774) 1 Cowp 204, tax and the Crown's authority in a colony
Holman v Johnson (1775) 1 Cowp 341, the illegality policy in contract law
Pierson v Dunlop (1777) Cowp. 571
Bach v Longman (1777) 2 Cowper 623, copyright
Da Costa v Jones (1778) 2 Cowp 729, on good faith in wagers
R v Baillie (1778) criminal libel
Pawson v Watson (1778) 2 Cowp 786, reasserting the general principle of good faith

1780s
Trial of Lord George Gordon (1781) high treason trial for Gordon riots against Catholics in London
R v Shipley (1784) libel
Forward v Pittard (1785) 1 Term Rep. 27, bailees

See also
English contract law
UK copyright law

Notes

Case law lists by judge
List